The Science Police is a fictional law enforcement agency in the , active in the 21st, 30th and 31st centuries. The organization has also appeared in the Legion of Super Heroes animated series, the DC Universe Online video game, and the Supergirl television series.

Fictional history

30th and 31st centuries
In the 30th and 31st centuries, the Science Police is under the jurisdiction of the United Planets and has divisions on each world within the U.P. Its headquarters are on Earth in the city of Metropolis. The Science Police has a professional working relationship with the Legion of Super-Heroes, with Shvaughn Erin serving as the SP's liaison to the Legion. Legionnaires Colossal Boy, Saturn Girl, Magno and Kinetix have all served with the Science Police at one time or another.

21st century
In the 21st century, the Science Police serve the federal government of the United States, with divisions in Metropolis and Midway City. The Science Police was created to replace the Special Crimes Unit, a division of the Metropolis Police Department that specialized in crimes committed by metahumans and aliens.

Metropolis' local Science Police are called into action when an unknown monster and later on Atlas attack the city during Superman's absence. Team leader DuBarry is shown to have self-confidence problems. The Science Police are assisted by a behind-the-scenes communications expert known as Control (a.k.a. Rachel) who is also the division's second-in-command.

DuBarry was killed along with fellow team leader Daniels and several prison guards when a team of Kandorians led by Commander Gor assaulted Stryker's Island and demanded custody of Parasite. The Science Police second-in-command Rachel asks Guardian to act as the liaison between the Metropolis Police Department and a coalition of superheroes in bringing justice for the fallen Science Police officers and prison guards. After the Kandorians left Earth, Guardian was appointed the team leader of the Science Police due in part to his cloned memories of Jim Harper's expertise as a police officer and a superhero.

Other versions
 In the Elseworld comic book Superboy's Legion, Superboy wishes to protect the planets not under the Science Police's protection, which inspires him to create the Legion.

In other media

Television
 The 31st century version of the Science Police appears in the Legion of Super Heroes TV series.
 The 31st-century version of the Science Police appears in the Batman: The Brave and the Bold episode "The Siege of Starro!" arresting the gang of Scavengers.
 The 21st century version of the Science Police appears in the Supergirl TV series, serving as a branch of National City's police department. Maggie Sawyer is one of the group's agents.

Video games
 The 21st century version of the Science Police appears in the DC Universe Online video game.

References

External links
 

DC Comics law enforcement agencies
Legion of Super-Heroes